The Silencers is a 1966 American spy comedy film directed by Phil Karlson, starring Dean Martin as agent Matt Helm. The screenplay by Oscar Saul is based on the 1962 novel of the same name by Donald Hamilton, while also adapting elements of Hamilton's first Helm novel, Death of a Citizen (1960). The film co-stars Stella Stevens, Daliah Lavi, Victor Buono, Arthur O'Connell, Robert Webber, James Gregory, Roger C. Carmel, Beverly Adams, and Cyd Charisse.

It is notable as being the first film to have a post-credits scene.

Plot
Once a photographer by day and spy by night, Matt Helm is now a happily retired secret agent, shooting photos of glamorous models instead of guns and enjoying a close relationship with his assistant, the lovely Lovey Kravezit. But then his old boss, Macdonald, coaxes him back to the agency ICE (Intelligence and Counter Espionage) to thwart a new threat from the villainous organization Big O.

The sinister Tung-Tze is masterminding a diabolical scheme to drop a missile on an underground atomic bomb test in New Mexico and possibly instigate a nuclear war in the process. Helm's assignment is to stop him, armed with a wide assortment of useful spy gadgets, plus the assistance of the capable femme fatale, Tina, and the seemingly incapable Gail Hendricks, a beautiful but bumbling possible enemy agent.

Along the way, Helm is nearly sidetracked by a mysterious knife-wielding seductress and he witnesses the murder of a beautiful Big O operative, the sultry striptease artist Sarita.

In the end, Helm prevails, with Gail by his side as he all but singlehandedly destroys Tung-Tze's evil enterprise and plot to rule the world.

Cast

Production

Development
Film producer Irving Allen had been in partnership with Albert R. Broccoli in Warwick Productions, who released through Columbia Pictures. Broccoli wanted to buy the rights to the James Bond series of novels, but Allen was not interested. The partnership broke up, Broccoli went into partnership with Harry Saltzman and United Artists on the Bond films and enjoyed tremendous success.

Allen decided to make his own spy series. He read a copy of one of the Matt Helm novels at an airport - "The Silencers or The Death of a Citizen, I forget which," he said later - and optioned the film rights in twenty four hours with his own money ("and it was a sizeable amount" he said).

In 1964 he set up the series with Columbia Pictures. The Silencers was to be the first.

Casting
Dean Martin was not the original choice for the lead. Allen said "We had wanted Paul Newman or one of the good stars but no one would go up against Sean Connery. Nobody wants to go up against a successful series."

Eventually it was decided to make the film a comedy and Allen suggested Dean Martin play Matt Helm. Martin signed in March 1965.

Director Phil Karlson had the idea to make the film in a tongue-in-cheek style.  Comedy writer Herbert Baker revised Oscar Saul's original script.  Martin was a co-producer of the Helm series. Moss Mabry provided the costumes, except for Martin's Sy Devore suits.

Richard Levinson and William Link also worked on the script of this and The Ambushers, the third film in the Matt Helm series.

Themes 
The film was the first of four produced between 1966 and 1969 starring Martin. The film series includes James Gregory as Macdonald, Helm's superior (played by John Larch in the fourth film) and Beverly Adams as Lovey Kravezit, Helm's photo assistant (character missing in fourth film). Whereas Hamilton's books were generally serious spy novels about a former Second World War assassin who is recruited to continue killing for an American government agency, the film versions were lighthearted spy romps spoofing the James Bond series in the same spirit as Our Man Flint, which was released the previous month. The Helm series has been cited as one of the principal inspirations for the Austin Powers spy comedies of the 1990s and early 2000s.

Reception
Released at the height of James Bond mania, The Silencers was a major box office hit in 1966, earning $7 million in United States rentals that year.

"It was a very lucky thing," said Allen, "great timing that Helm caught on the same time Dean's TV series took off."

There were three follow-up films, including Murderers' Row (also released in 1966), The Ambushers (1967) and The Wrecking Crew (1969). A fifth film, The Ravagers, was announced, but never produced.

Soundtrack 
Elmer Bernstein provided the score. The title song is performed by Vikki Carr, though Cyd Charisse opens the film with a sexy striptease-style dance while lip synching to Carr's vocals. Carr also sings "Santiago" on the soundtrack.  Two soundtrack albums were released — Bernstein's original score on an RCA Victor album that does not feature any artwork of Dean Martin, and a Reprise album by Martin singing several songs that were featured in the film, along with some instrumentals by the Mike Leander Orchestra.

A scopitone video of the title song was sung by Joi Lansing.  Carr's version of the title song was also used on the soundtrack of the film Confessions of a Dangerous Mind.

In 2016, English label Vocalion issued the soundtrack on a CD, catalog number CDLK4573.

Adaptation
The Silencers borrows a plot element from the first Helm novel, Death of a Citizen, as it begins with the agent being coaxed out of retirement. Helm's mission is to stop an evil organization called "BIG O" (the Bureau for International Government and Order) from their plan of "Operation Fallout": diverting an American missile into an underground atomic bomb testing site in New Mexico.

See also
 List of American films of 1966

References

External links
 
 
 
 
 
  Elmer Bernstein
  Dean Martin

1966 films
1966 comedy films
1960s American films
1960s English-language films
1960s spy comedy films
American spy comedy films
Columbia Pictures films
Films about fashion photographers
Films based on American novels
Films based on multiple works of a series
Films directed by Phil Karlson
Films scored by Elmer Bernstein